Bay breeze or Bay Breeze may refer to:
Sea breeze, wind that develops over land near coasts
Bay breeze (cocktail), a type of cocktail similar to the sea breeze (cocktail)
Bay Area Breeze, Hayward, California, women's soccer team

See also
 Bay (disambiguation)
 Breeze (disambiguation)
 Gulf breeze (disambiguation)